Stack Stalk is an outdoor 2001 sculpture by Ean Eldred and the architectural firm Rigga, located along the Eastbank Esplanade in Portland, Oregon.

Description

The sculpture, designed by Ean Eldred and Rigga and completed in 2001, was funded by the City of Portland Development Commission's Percent for Art program. It is one of four by Rigga along the esplanade; the others are Alluvial Wall by Peter Nylen, Echo Gate by Eldred and Ghost Ship by James Harrison. Stack Stalk is composed of mild steel, stainless steel, glass float and electric light, and measures  x  x . The abstract lamp post contains graduated cylinders stacked to support the glass float. cultureNOW describes it as "Part smoke stack, part sheaf of wheat... a beacon holding a Japanese glass fishing float from the coast up to the sky."

According to the Regional Arts & Culture Council, which administers the sculpture, it commemorates the "hybrid nature of the river-port as a meeting point for eastern Oregon's agriculture with ocean bound ships. Blending a stalk of barley with a rustic smoke stack, it suspends a Japanese glass float in the sky as a reminder of the rivers connection with the Pacific Ocean." It is part of the City of Portland and Multnomah County Public Art Collection courtesy of the Regional Arts & Culture Council.

Reception
The sculpture was mentioned in Willamette Week "Dr. Know" column in an article about phallic sculptures in Portland.

See also

 2001 in art
 Statue of Vera Katz, a 2006 sculpture of Vera Katz along the Eastbank Esplanade

References

External links
 Stack Stalk at the Public Art Archive
 Portland Cultural Tours: Public Art Walking Tour (PDF), Regional Arts & Culture Council

2001 establishments in Oregon
2001 sculptures
Abstract sculptures in Oregon
Buckman, Portland, Oregon
Outdoor sculptures in Portland, Oregon
Stainless steel sculptures in Oregon
Steel sculptures in Oregon